Pavia–Mantua railway is a railway line in Lombardy, Italy.

History 
The section from Pavia to Cremona was opened on 15 December 1866. The section from Cremona to Mantua was opened after the Second Italian War of Independence in 1874.

References

Footnotes

Sources

See also 
 List of railway lines in Italy

Railway lines in Lombardy
Railway lines opened in 1874